Francis X. Shaffer (December 6, 1859 – March 18, 1939) was a Major League Baseball player in the 19th century.

Career
Frank Shaffer was born in Pittsburgh, Pennsylvania, in 1859. His professional baseball career consists of six games played in 1884 for Altoona Mountain City of the Union Association. He appeared in four games as an outfielder, one as a third baseman, and one as a catcher, with a batting average of .158.

Shaffer was 5'11" and weighed 160 pounds. He died in Eloise, Michigan, in 1939.

References

External links

1859 births
1939 deaths
19th-century baseball players
Altoona Mountain Citys players
Baseball players from Pennsylvania